The third quarter is due to air this quarter with the last defending champion of Quarter II will return for Quarter III.

Daily rounds 
Color Key:

Contender's Information:

Results Details:

Italicized names denotes a contender is a resbaker
DW denotes contender as the daily winner
DC denotes contender as the defending champion

 *due to the semi-finals, JLou Florentino (Mindanao) will proceed to Quarter IV.

Semifinals 
The semifinals will take place at the end of the third quarter which will determine the two grand finalists that will take place in 2019. The two grand finalists will receive a medal and an additional 150,000 cash, while the remaining contenders will receive additional 25,000. The score will be composed of 50% coming from the judges and 50% from the text and/or online votes. A semi-finalist may be "gonged" during this stage and be eliminated from the competition.

Summary of semifinalists

Semifinal results 
The third quarter of the contest covered the months from February to March. The week-long showdown took place on April 1–6, 2019.

Color Key:

 Group Performance: ("April Boy Regino Medley"), with guest performer, April Boy Regino

Charizze Arnigo (Mindanao) and Jonas Oñate (Visayas) were announced as the 5th and 6th grand finalists.

References
Notes

Scores

Sources

External links
 Tawag ng Tanghalan

Tawag ng Tanghalan seasons
2019 Philippine television seasons